Bachelor of Letters (BLitt or LittB; Latin  or ) is a second undergraduate university degree in which students specialize in an area of study relevant to their own personal, professional, or academic development. This area of study may have been touched on in a prior undergraduate degree but not studied in depth, or may never have been formally taught to the student. The degree is less often awarded now than in previous centuries, and is, at the current time, only awarded by two universities in Australia and four universities in Turkey, although it is still very common in Brazil.

Australia
Although the BLitt degree was once awarded by many Australian universities, it is now awarded only by Flinders University, Monash University as an arts-based degree exclusively for university graduates, and, until recently, the University of Western Australia. The BLitt was once offered by the Australian National University, Deakin University and the University of Melbourne.

Brazil
To graduate as a Bachelor of Letters (Bacharelado em Letras) in Brazil typically requires coursework in Literature, Linguistics, and, depending on the institution, Translation Studies. It takes four to five years to complete such a bachelor's degree, and graduates often pursue careers in translation or research.
A Bachelor of Letters degree may differ from the Licentiate degree called Licenciatura em Letras, which focuses on teaching and Applied Linguistics, and thus includes coursework and seminars on pedagogy and classroom practice, to prepare graduates to become language instructors. 
It also takes four or five years to complete a Licenciate degree, and students are expected to focus their studies on a foreign language and/or Portuguese. Unlike a bachelor's degree in Letters, a Licenciate Degree qualifies graduates to teach at public and private schools in Brazil.

United Kingdom   
The degree was awarded by the University of Oxford and a small number of other universities, including the University of Birmingham. It was still available at Oxford in 1977 though it has since been replaced by the more research-based Master of Letters degree. Unsuccessful candidates for the DPhil at Oxford were, certainly until the 1960s, offered the option of accepting the BLitt if they did not wish to revise their thesis in a further attempt to be admitted to the degree of DPhil. The verb "to BLitt" a candidate was sometimes used to indicate that the BLitt had been obtained via this route, hence, for example "He was BLitt-ed."

United States
In the late 19th century the degree was awarded at the University of Michigan. During the early years, Marywood University, formerly a women's college, offered the degree.  A degree of Bachelor of Arts in Letters has been awarded at the University of Oklahoma since 1937, when the school of Letters was organized in the College of Arts and Sciences.

References

Education in England
Letters